Bernice Tyrone Mosby (born February 14, 1984) is a professional basketball player who played with the Washington Mystics in the WNBA from 2007 to 2009. Currently playing for KEB Hana Bank in the Korean Women's League.

Florida and Baylor statistics

Source

References

External links
Baylor Lady Bears bio 

1984 births
Living people
American expatriate basketball people in China
American expatriate basketball people in France
American expatriate basketball people in Greece
American expatriate basketball people in Israel
American expatriate basketball people in Italy
American expatriate basketball people in Poland
American expatriate basketball people in Portugal
American expatriate basketball people in South Korea
American expatriate basketball people in Spain
American women's basketball players
Basketball players from Florida
Baylor Bears women's basketball players
Florida Gators women's basketball players
Forwards (basketball)
Jiangsu Phoenix players
People from Avon Park, Florida
Washington Mystics draft picks
Washington Mystics players